The  Chapecozinho River is a river of Santa Catarina state in southeastern Brazil. It is part of the Uruguay River basin.
It is a tributary of the Chapecó River.

The river is fed by streams rising in the Araucárias National Park, a  conservation unit created in 2005.

See also
List of rivers of Santa Catarina

References

 Map from Ministry of Transport

Rivers of Santa Catarina (state)